This is a list of players, both past and current, who appeared at least in one game for the Detroit Tigers, with their main position and years played.

Players in Bold are members of the National Baseball Hall of Fame.

Players in Italics have had their numbers retired by the team.



A

Glenn Abbott, P, 1983–1984
Al Aber, P, 1953–1957
Juan Acevedo, P, 2002
Austin Adams, P, 2019
Bob Adams, IF, 1977
Jim Adduci, OF, 2017–2018
Hank Aguirre, P, 1958–1967
Pat Ahearne, P, 1995
Eddie Ainsmith, C, 1919–1921
Bill Akers, IF, 1929–1931
Al Alburquerque, P, 2011–2015
Sergio Alcántara, IF, 2020
Victor Alcántara, P, 2017–2019
Scott Aldred, P, 1990–1992, 1996
Dale Alexander, IF, 1929–1932
Doyle Alexander, P, 1987–1989
Tyler Alexander, P, 2019–present
Andy Allanson, C, 1991
Dusty Allen, IF, 2000
Rod Allen, DH, 1984
Ernie Alten, P, 1920
George Alusik, OF, 1958–1962
Luis Alvarado, IF, 1977
Gabe Alvarez, IF, 1998–2000
José Álvarez, P, 2013
Ossie Álvarez, IF, 1959
Sandy Amorós, OF, 1960
Bob Anderson, P, 1963
Josh Anderson, OF, 2009
Matt Anderson, P, 1998–2003
Jimmy Archer, C, 1907
George Archie, IF, 1938
Harry Arndt, IF, 1902
Fernando Arroyo, P, 1975–1979
Elden Auker, P, 1933–1938
Brad Ausmus, C, 1996, 1999–2000
Earl Averill, OF, 1939–1940
Steve Avery, P, 2003
Alex Avila, C, 2009–2015, 2017
Mike Avilés, IF, 2016
Erick Aybar, IF, 2016
Doc Ayers, P, 1919–1921

B

Akil Baddoo, OF, 2021–present
Javier Báez, IF, 2022–present
Sandy Báez, P, 2018–2019
Bill Bailey, P, 1918
Howard Bailey, P, 1981–1983
Doug Bair, P, 1983–1985
Del Baker, C, 1914–1916
Doug Baker, IF, 1984–1987
Jeff Baker, IF,  2012
Steve Baker, P, 1978–1979
Paul Bako, C, 1998
Billy Baldwin, OF, 1975
Collin Balester, P, 2012
Chris Bando, C, 1988
Johnny Barbato, P, 2018
Ray Bare, P, 1975–1977
Clyde Barfoot, P, 1926
Frank Barnes, P, 1929
Jacob Barnes, P, 2022
Sam Barnes, IF, 1921
Skeeter Barnes, IF, 1991–1994
Tucker Barnhart, C, 2022
Jimmy Barrett, OF, 1901–1905
Kimera Bartee, OF, 1996–1999
Dick Bartell, IF, 1940–1941
Al Baschang, OF, 1912
Johnny Bassler, C, 1921–1927
Matt Batts, C, 1952–1954
Paddy Baumann, IF, 1911–1914
Harry Baumgartner, P, 1920
John Baumgartner, IF, 1953
Danny Bautista, OF, 1993–1996
Denny Bautista, P, 2008
José Bautista, P, 1997
Yorman Bazardo, P, 2007–2008
Trey Beamon, OF, 1998
Billy Bean, OF, 1987–1989
Billy Beane, OF, 1988
Dave Beard, P, 1989
Gene Bearden, P, 1951
Boom-Boom Beck, P, 1944
Erve Beck, IF, 1902
Heinie Beckendorf, C, 1909–1910
Rich Becker, OF, 2000–2001
Gordon Beckham, IF, 2019
Wayne Belardi, IF, 1954–1956
Tim Belcher, P, 1994
Francis Beltrán, P, 2008
Beau Bell, OF, 1939
Chad Bell, P, 2017–2018
Duane Below, P, 2011–2013
Joaquín Benoit, P, 2011–2013
Al Benton, P, 1938–1948
Lou Berberet, C, 1959–1960
Juan Berenguer, P, 1982–1985
Dave Bergman, IF, 1984–1992
Sean Bergman, P, 1993–1996
Tony Bernazard, IF, 1991
Adam Bernero, P, 2000–2003
Johnny Bero, IF, 1948
Gerónimo Berroa, DH, 1998
Neil Berry, IF, 1948–1952
Quintin Berry, OF, 2012
Reno Bertoia, IF, 1953–1958, 1961–1962
Wilson Betemit, IF, 2011
Jason Beverlin, P, 2002
Monte Beville, C, 1904
Steve Bilko, IF, 1960
Jack Billingham, P, 1978–1980
Josh Billings, P, 1927–1929
Babe Birrer, P, 1955
Bud Black, P, 1952–1956
Willie Blair, P, 1996–2001
Ike Blessitt, OF, 1972
Ben Blomdahl, P, 1995
Jimmy Bloodworth, IF, 1942–1946
Lu Blue, IF, 1921–1927
Hiram Bocachica, OF, 2002–2003
Doug Bochtler, P, 1998
Randy Bockus, P, 1989
Brennan Boesch, OF, 2010–2012
George Boehler, P, 1912–1916
Joe Boever, P, 1993–1995
John Bogart, P, 1920
Brian Bohanon, P, 1995
Bernie Boland, P, 1915–1920
Frank Bolling, IF, 1954–1960
Milt Bolling, IF, 1958
Cliff Bolton, C, 1937
Tom Bolton, P, 1993
Jorge Bonifacio, OF, 2020
Jeremy Bonderman, P, 2003–2010, 2013
Eddie Bonine, P, 2008–2010
Dan Boone, P, 1921
Ray Boone, IF, 1953–1958
Dave Borkowski, P, 1999–2001
Red Borom, IF, 1944–1945
Steve Boros, IF, 1957–1962
Hank Borowy, P, 1950–1957
Dave Boswell, P, 1971
Matt Boyd, P, 2015–2021
Jim Brady, P, 1956
Ralph Branca, P, 1953–1954
Jim Brideweser, IF, 1956
Rocky Bridges, IF, 1959–1960
Tommy Bridges, P, 1930–1946
Beau Brieske, P, 2022–present
Ed Brinkman, IF, 1971–1974
Doug Brocail, P, 1997–2000
Rico Brogna, IF, 1992–1994
Ike Brookens, P, 1975
Tom Brookens, IF, 1979–1988
Louis Brower, IF, 1931
Chris Brown, IF, 1989
Darrell Brown, OF, 1981
Dick Brown, C, 1961–1962
Gates Brown, OF, 1963–1975
Ike Brown, IF, 1969–1974
Frank Browning, P, 1910
Bob Bruce, P, 1959–1961
Andy Bruckmiller, P, 1905
Mike Brumley, IF, 1989
Arlo Brunsberg, C, 1966
Will Brunson, P, 1998–1999
Bill Bruton, OF, 1961–1964
Johnny Bucha, C, 1953
Don Buddin, IF, 1962
Fritz Buelow, C, 1901–1904
George Bullard, IF, 1954
Jim Bunning, P, 1955–1963
Les Burke, IF, 1923–1926
Bill Burns, P, 1912
George Burns, IF, 1914–1917
Jack Burns, IF, 1936
Jack Burns, IF, 1903–1904
Joe Burns, OF, 1913
Pete Burnside, P, 1959–1960
Sheldon Burnside, P, 1978–1979
Beau Burrows, P, 2020–2021
Donie Bush, IF, 1908–1921
Sal Butera, C, 1983
Harry Byrd, P, 1957
Tim Byrdak, P, 2007

C

 Enos Cabell, IF, 1982–1983
 Miguel Cabrera, IF, 2008–present
 Greg Cadaret, P, 1994
 Bob Cain, P, 1951
 Les Cain, P, 1968–1972
 Paul Calvert, P, 1950–1951
 Daz Cameron, OF, 2020–2022
 Bill Campbell, P, 1986
 Bruce Campbell, OF, 1940–1941
 Dave Campbell, IF, 1967–1969
 Paul Campbell, IF, 1948–1950
 Jeimer Candelario, IF, 2017–2022
 Guy Cantrell, P, 1930
 José Capellán, P, 2007
 George Cappuzzello, P, 1981
 Javier Cardona, C, 2000–2002
 Fred Carisch, C, 1923
 Drew Carlton, P, 2021–2022
 Kerry Carpenter, OF, 2022–present
 Ryan Carpenter, P, 2018–2019
 Charlie Carr, IF, 1903–1904
 Mark Carreon, OF, 1992
 Ezequiel Carrera, OF, 2014
 Ownie Carroll, P, 1925–1930
 Frank Carswell, OF, 1953
 Chuck Cary, P, 1985–1986
 Jerry Casale, P, 1961–1962
 Raul Casanova, C, 1996–1999
 Doc Casey, IF, 1901–1902
 Joe Casey, C, 1909–1911
 Sean Casey, IF, 2006–2007
 Norm Cash, IF, 1960–1974
 Ron Cash, IF, 1973–1974
 Nicholas Castellanos, OF, 2013–2019
 George Caster, P, 1945–1946
 Frank Castillo, P, 1998
 Luis Castillo, P, 2022
 Marty Castillo, IF, 1981–1985
 Anthony Castro, P, 2020
 Harold Castro, IF, 2018–2022
 Willi Castro, IF, 2019–2022
 Frank Catalanotto, OF, 1997–1999
 Pug Cavet, P, 1911–1915
 Andújar Cedeño, IF, 1996
 Roger Cedeño, OF, 2000–2001
 John Cerutti, P, 1991
 Yoenis Céspedes, OF, 2015
 Andrew Chafin, P, 2022
 Joba Chamberlain, P, 2014–2015
 Dean Chance, P, 1971
 Harry Chiti, C, 1960–1961
 Mike Chris, P, 1979
 Neil Chrisley, OF, 1959–1960
 Bob Christian, OF, 1968
 Mark Christman, IF, 1938–1939
 Mike Christopher, P, 1995–1996
 Al Cicotte, P, 1958
 Eddie Cicotte, P, 1905
 José Cisnero, P, 2019–present
 Davey Claire, IF, 1920
 Danny Clark, IF, 1922
 Jermaine Clark, OF, 2001
 Mel Clark, OF, 1957
 Phil Clark, OF, 1992
 Tony Clark, IF, 1995–2001
 Nig Clarke, C, 1905
 Rufe Clarke, P, 1923–1924
 Al Clauss, P, 1913
 Kody Clemens, IF/OF, 2022
 Brent Clevlen, OF, 2006–2007
 Flea Clifton, IF, 1934–1937
 Joe Cobb, DH, 1918
Ty Cobb, OF, 1905–1926
Mickey Cochrane, C, 1934–1937
 Jack Coffey, IF, 1918
 Slick Coffman, P, 1937–1939
 Phil Coke, P, 2010–2014
 Rocky Colavito, OF, 1960–1963
 Nate Colbert, IF, 1975
 Bert Cole, P, 1921–1925
 Joe Coleman, P, 1955
 Joe Coleman, P, 1971–1976
 Louis Coleman, P,  2018
 Vince Coleman, OF, 1997
 Darnell Coles, IF, 1986–1987, 1990
 Orlin Collier, P, 1931
 Dave Collins, OF, 1986
 Kevin Collins, IF, 1970–1971
 Rip Collins, P, 1923–1927
 Tyler Collins, OF, 2014–2017
 Román Colón, P, 2005–2007
 Steve Colyer, P, 2004
 Wayne Comer, OF, 1967–1968, 1972
 Ralph Comstock, P, 1913
 Dick Conger, P, 1940
 Allen Conkwright, P, 1920
 Bill Connelly, P, 1950
 Earl Cook, P, 1941
 Duff Cooley, OF, 1905
 Jack Coombs, P, 1920
 Wilbur Cooper, P, 1926
 Tim Corcoran, IF, 1977–1980
 Francisco Cordero, P, 1999
 Nate Cornejo, P, 2001–2004
 Red Corriden, IF, 1912
 Chuck Cottier, IF, 1961
 Johnny Couch, P, 1917
 Bill Coughlin, IF, 1904–1908
 Ernie Courtney, IF, 1903
 Harry Coveleski, P, 1914–1918
 Tex Covington, P, 1911–1912
 Al Cowens, OF, 1980–1981
 Red Cox, P, 1920
 Doc Cramer, OF, 1942–1948
 Jim Crawford, P, 1976–1978
 Sam Crawford, OF, 1903–1917
 Doug Creek, P, 2005
 Jack Crimian, P, 1957
 Leo Cristante, P, 1955
 Davey Crockett, IF, 1901
 C. J. Cron, IF, 2020
 Jack Cronin, P, 1901–1902
 Casey Crosby, P, 2012
 Frank Croucher, IF, 1939–1941
 Dean Crow, P, 1998
 Alvin Crowder, P, 1934–1936
 Francisco Cruceta, P, 2008
 Roy Crumpler, P, 1920
 Deivi Cruz, IF, 1997–2001
 Fausto Cruz, IF, 1996
 Jacob Cruz, OF, 2002
 Nelson Cruz, P, 1999–2000
 William Cuevas, P, 2017
 Roy Cullenbine, OF, 1938–1939, 1945–1947
 John Cummings, P, 1996–1997
 George Cunningham, P, 1916–1921
 Jim Curry, IF, 1918
 Chad Curtis, OF, 1995–1996
 George Cutshaw, IF, 1922–1923
 Milt Cuyler, OF, 1990–1995

D

 Jack Dalton, OF, 1916
 Mike Dalton, P, 1991
 Johnny Damon, OF, 2010
 Chuck Daniel, P, 1957
 Vic Darensbourg, P, 2005
 Jeff Datz, C, 1989
 Doc Daugherty, PH, 1951
 Hooks Dauss, P, 1912–1926
 Jerry Davie, P, 1959
 Brendon Davis, IF, 2022
 Eric Davis, OF, 1993–1994
 Harry Davis, IF, 1932–1933
 Rajai Davis, OF, 2014–2015
 Storm Davis, P, 1993–1994
 Woody Davis, P, 1938
 Charlie Deal, IF, 1912–1913
 Rob Deer, OF, 1991–1993
 John Deering, P, 1903
 Tony DeFate, IF, 1917
 Ángel De Jesús, P, 2022
 Iván DeJesús, IF, 1988
 Mark DeJohn, IF, 1982
 Eulogio De La Cruz, P, 2006–2007
 Miguel Del Pozo, P, 2021
 Jim Delahanty, IF, 1909–1912
 Jim Delsing, OF, 1952–1956
 Travis Demeritte, OF, 2019–2020
 Don Demeter, OF, 1964–1966
 Steve Demeter, IF, 1959
 Ray Demmitt, OF, 1914
 Matt den Dekker, OF, 2017
 Bill Denehy, P, 1971
 Gene Desautels, C, 1930–1933
 John DeSilva, P, 1993
 Bernie DeViveiros, IF, 1927
 Miguel Díaz, P, 2022
 Mike DiFelice, C, 2004
 Bob Didier, C, 1973
 Steve Dillard, IF, 1978
 Pop Dillon, IF, 1901–1902
 Craig Dingman, P, 2004–2005
 Andy Dirks, OF, 2011–2013
 George Disch, P, 1905
 Glenn Dishman, P, 1997
 Jack Dittmer, IF, 1957
 Brandon Dixon, IF, 2019–2020
 Brent Dlugach, IF, 2009
 Pat Dobson, P, 1967–1969
Larry Doby, OF, 1959
 John Doherty, P, 1992–1995
 Frank Doljack, OF, 1930–1934
 Freddy Dolsi, P, 2008–2009
 Red Donahue, P, 1906
 Jim Donohue, P, 1961
 Wild Bill Donovan, P, 1903–1912, 1918
 Dick Donovan, P, 1954
 Tom Doran, C, 1905
 Octavio Dotel, P, 2012–2013
 Sean Douglass, P, 2005
 Snooks Dowd, IF, 1919
 Darin Downs, P, 2012–2013
 Red Downs, IF, 1907–1908
 Jess Doyle, P, 1925–1927
 Delos Drake, OF, 1911
 Lee Dressen, IF, 1918
 Lew Drill, C, 1904–1905
 Walt Dropo, IF, 1952–1954
 Brian Dubois, P, 1989–1990
 Jean Dubuc, P, 1912–1916
 Joe Dugan, IF, 1931
 Roberto Durán, P, 1997–1998
 Chad Durbin, P, 2006–2007
 Bob Dustal, P, 1963
 Ben Dyer, IF, 1916–1919
 Duffy Dyer, C, 1980–1981

E

 Scott Earl, IF, 1984
 Damion Easley, IF, 1996–2002
 Mal Eason, P, 1903
 Paul Easterling, OF, 1928–1930
 Zeb Eaton, P, 1944–1945
 Eric Eckenstahler, P, 2002–2003
 Dick Egan, P, 1963–1964
 Wish Egan, P, 1902
 Howard Ehmke, P, 1916–1922
 Joey Eischen, P, 1996
 Harry Eisenstat, P, 1938–1939
 Kid Elberfeld, IF, 1901–1903
 Heinie Elder, P, 1913
 Brad Eldred, IF, 2012
 Babe Ellison, IF, 1916–1920
 Juan Encarnación, OF, 1997–2001
 Dave Engle, C, 1986
 Gil English, IF, 1936–1937
 John Ennis, P, 2004
 Eric Erickson, P, 1916–1919
 Hal Erickson, P, 1953
 Tex Erwin, C, 1907
 John Eubank, P, 1905–1907
 Bart Evans, P, 2000
 Darrell Evans, IF, 1984–1988
 Adam Everett, IF, 2009–2010
 Hoot Evers, OF, 1941–1952, 1954

F

 Roy Face, P, 1968
 Alex Faedo, P, 2022–present
 Bill Fahey, C, 1981–1983
 Ferris Fain, IF, 1955
 Bob Farley, IF, 1962
 Buck Farmer, P, 2014–2021
 Ed Farmer, P, 1973
 Jeff Farnsworth, P, 2002
 Kyle Farnsworth, P, 2005, 2008
 John Farrell, P, 1996
 Bill Faul, P, 1962–1964
 Al Federoff, IF, 1951–1952
 Junior Félix, OF, 1994
 Neftalí Feliz, P, 2015
 Jack Feller, C, 1958
 Chico Fernández, IF, 1960–1963
 José Fernández, P, 2019
 Jeff Ferrell, P, 2015, 2017
 Cy Ferry, P, 1904
 Robert Fick, IF, 1998–2002
 Mark Fidrych, P, 1976–1980
 Cecil Fielder, IF, 1990–1996
 Prince Fielder, IF, 2012–2013
 Bruce Fields, OF, 1986
 Daniel Fields, OF, 2015
 Casey Fien, P, 2009–2010
 Mike Fiers, P, 2018
 Alfredo Fígaro, P, 2009–2010
 Jim Finigan, IF, 1957
 Happy Finneran, P, 1918
 Bill Fischer, P, 1958, 1960–1961
 Carl Fischer, P, 1933–1935
 Ed Fisher, P, 1902
 Fritz Fisher, P, 1964
 Doug Fister, P, 2011–2013
 Ira Flagstead, OF, 1917–1923
 John Flaherty, C, 1994–1996
 Les Fleming, IF, 1939
 Scott Fletcher, IF, 1995
 Tom Fletcher, P, 1962
 Van Fletcher, P, 1955
 Bryce Florie, P, 1997–1999
 Ben Flowers, P, 1955
 Bubba Floyd, IF, 1944
 Doug Flynn, IF, 1985
 Hank Foiles, C, 1960
 Jason Foley, P, 2021–present
 Jim Foor, P, 1971–1972
 Gene Ford, P, 1905
 Casey Fossum, P, 2008
 Larry Foster, P, 1963
 Bob Fothergill, OF, 1922–1930
 Steve Foucault, P, 1977–1978
 Pete Fox, OF, 1933–1940
 Terry Fox, P, 1961–1966
 Paul Foytack, P, 1953–1963
 Ray Francis, P, 1923
 Tito Francona, OF, 1958
 Moe Franklin, IF, 1941–1942
 Jeff Frazier, OF, 2010
 Vic Frazier, P, 1933–1934
 Bill Freehan, C, 1961–1976
 George Freese, IF, 1953
 Luke French, P, 2009
 Cy Fried, P, 1920
 Owen Friend, IF, 1953
 Emil Frisk, OF, 1901
 Bill Froats, P, 1955
 Travis Fryman, IF, 1990–1997
 Woodie Fryman, P, 1972–1974
 Charlie Fuchs, P, 1942
 Tito Fuentes, IF, 1977
 Frank Fuller, IF, 1915–1916
 Carson Fulmer, P, 2020
 Michael Fulmer, P, 2016–2018, 2020–2022
 Liz Funk, OF, 1930
 Kyle Funkhouser, P, 2020–2021
 Charlie Furbush, P, 2011

G

 Chick Gagnon, IF, 1922
 Eddie Gaillard, P, 1997
 Del Gainer, IF, 1909–1914
 Dan Gakeler, P, 1991
 Armando Galarraga, P, 2008–2010
 Doug Gallagher, P, 1962
 Chick Galloway, IF, 1928
 John Gamble, IF, 1972–1973
 Bárbaro Garbey, IF, 1984–1985
 Alex Garbowski, PH, 1952
 Avisaíl García, OF, 2012–2013
 Bryan Garcia, P, 2019–2021
 Freddy García, P, 2008
 Karim García, OF, 1999–2000
 Luis García, IF, 1999
 Pedro García, IF, 1976
 Rony García, P, 2020–present
 Mike Gardiner, P, 1993–1995
 Dustin Garneau, C, 2021–2022
 Reed Garrett, P, 2019
 Ned Garver, P, 1952–1956
 Charlie Gehringer, IF, 1924–1942
 Charlie Gelbert, IF, 1937
 Rufe Gentry, P, 1943–1948
 Mike Gerber, OF, 2018
 Franklyn Germán, P, 2002–2006
 Dick Gernert, IF, 1960–1961
 Doc Gessler, OF, 1903
 Tony Giarratano, IF, 2005
 Frank Gibson, C, 1913
 Kirk Gibson, OF, 1979–1987, 1993–1995
 Paul Gibson, P, 1988–1991
 Sam Gibson, P, 1926–1928
 Floyd Giebell, P, 1939–1941
 Bill Gilbreth, P, 1971–1972
 George Gill, P, 1937–1939
 Bob Gillespie, P, 1944
 Joe Ginsberg, C, 1948–1953
 Matt Ginter, P, 2005
 Dan Gladden, OF, 1992–1993
 Fred Gladding, P, 1961–1967
 John Glaiser, P, 1920
 Norman Glaser, P, 1920
 Kid Gleason, IF, 1901–1902
 Jerry Don Gleaton, P, 1990–1991
 Gary Glover, P, 2008
 Ed Glynn, P, 1975–1978
 Greg Gohr, P, 1993–1996
 Izzy Goldstein, P, 1932
 Purnal Goldy, OF, 1962–1963
 Alexis Gómez, OF, 2005–2006
 Chris Gomez, IF, 1993–1996
 Dan Gonzales, OF, 1979–1980
 Álex González, IF, 2014
 Enrique González, P, 2010–2011
 Juan González, OF, 2000
 Julio González, IF, 1983
 Luis Gonzalez, OF, 1998
 Andrew Good, P, 2005
 Niko Goodrum, IF, 2018–2021
 Johnny Gorsica, P, 1940–1947
 Tom Gorzelanny, P, 2015
 Anthony Gose, OF, 2015–2016
Goose Goslin, OF, 1934–1937
 Johnny Grabowski, C, 1931
 Bill Graham, P, 1966
 Skinny Graham, P, 1929
 Curtis Granderson, OF, 2004–2009
 Mark Grater, P, 1993
 Beiker Graterol, P, 1999
 Ted Gray, P, 1946–1954
 Lenny Green, OF, 1967–1968
 Hank Greenberg, IF, 1930–1946
 Al Greene, DH, 1979
 Paddy Greene, IF, 1903
 Riley Greene, OF, 2022–present
 Shane Greene, P, 2015–2019
 Grayson Greiner, C, 2018–2021
 Seth Greisinger, P, 1998, 2002
 Ed Gremminger, IF, 1904
 Art Griggs, IF, 1918
 Jason Grilli, P, 2005–2008
 Steve Grilli, P, 1975–1977
 Marv Grissom, P, 1949
 Steve Gromek, P, 1953–1957
 Buddy Groom, P, 1992–1995
 Robbie Grossman, OF, 2021–2022
 Johnny Groth, OF, 1946–1952, 1957–1960
 Charlie Grover, P, 1913
 Johnny Grubb, OF, 1983–1987
 Joe Grzenda, P, 1961
 Carlos Guillén, IF, 2004–2011
 Bill Gullickson, P, 1991–1994
 Dave Gumpert, P, 1982–1983
 César Gutiérrez, IF, 1969–1971

H

 Dave Haas, P, 1991–1993
 Eric Haase, C, 2020–present
 Sammy Hale, IF, 1920–1921
 Charley Hall, P, 1918
 Herb Hall, P, 1918
 Joe Hall, OF, 1995–1997
 Marc Hall, P, 1913–1914
 Matt Hall, P, 2018–2019
 Tom Haller, C, 1972
 Shane Halter, IF, 2000–2003
 Bob Hamelin, DH, 1997
 Earl Hamilton, P, 1916
 Jack Hamilton, P, 1964–1965
 Luke Hamlin, P, 1933–1934
 Fred Haney, IF, 1922–1925
 Don Hankins, P, 1927
 Jack Hannahan, IF, 2006
 Jim Hannan, P, 1971
 Charlie Harding, P, 1913
 Blaine Hardy, P, 2014–2019
 Shawn Hare, OF, 1991–1992
 Pinky Hargrave, C, 1928–1930
 Dick Harley, OF, 1902
 Brian Harper, C, 1986
 George Harper, OF, 1916–1918
 Terry Harper, OF, 1987
 Denny Harriger, P, 1998
 Andy Harrington, PH, 1925
 Bob Harris, P, 1938–1939
 Bucky Harris, IF, 1929–1931
 Gail Harris, IF, 1958–1960
 Gene Harris, P, 1994
 Ned Harris, OF, 1941–1946
 Josh Harrison, IF, 2019
 Earl Harrist, P, 1953
 Bill Haselman, C, 1998–1999
 Fred Hatfield, IF, 1952–1956
 Clyde Hatter, P, 1935–1937
 Brad Havens, P, 1989
 Ray Hayworth, C, 1926–1938
 Bob Hazle, OF, 1958
 Bill Heath, C, 1967
 Mike Heath, C, 1986–1990
 Richie Hebner, IF, 1980–1982
 Don Heffner, IF, 1944
 Jim Hegan, C, 1958
Harry Heilmann, OF, 1914–1929
 Don Heinkel, P, 1988
 Mike Henneman, P, 1987–1995
 Les Hennessy, IF, 1913
 Oscar Henríquez, P, 2001–2003
 Dwayne Henry, P, 1995
 Roy Henshaw, P, 1942–1944
 Ray Herbert, P, 1950–1954
 Babe Herman, OF, 1937
 Fernando Hernández, P, 1997
 Willie Hernández, P, 1984–1989
 Larry Herndon, OF, 1982–1988
 Art Herring, P, 1929–1933
Whitey Herzog, OF, 1963
 Mike Hessman, IF, 2007
 Gus Hetling, IF, 1906
 Phil Hiatt, IF, 1996
 Charlie Hickman, IF, 1904–1905
 Buddy Hicks, IF, 1956
 John Hicks, C, 2016–2019
 Pinky Higgins, IF, 1939–1944, 1946
 Bobby Higginson, OF, 1995–2005
 Ed High, P, 1901
 Hugh High, OF, 1913–1914
 Erik Hiljus, P, 1999–2000
 Derek Hill, OF, 2020–2022
 Garrett Hill, P, 2022–present
 John Hiller, P, 1965–1980
 A. J. Hinch, C, 2003
 Billy Hitchcock, IF, 1942–1946, 1953
 Billy Hoeft, P, 1952–1959
 Elon Hogsett, P, 1929–1936, 1944
 Bryan Holaday, C, 2012–2015, 2017
 Fred Holdsworth, P, 1972–1974
 Derek Holland, P, 2021
 Michael Hollimon, IF, 2008–2009
 Carl Holling, P, 1921–1922
 Ken Holloway, P, 1922–1928
 Shawn Holman, P, 1989
 Ducky Holmes, OF, 1901–1902
 Chris Holt, P, 2000–2001
 Vern Holtgrave, P, 1965
 Kevin Hooper, IF, 2005–2006
 Joe Hoover, IF, 1943–1945
 Johnny Hopp, OF, 1952
 Willie Horton, OF, 1963–1977
 Tim Hosley, C, 1970–1971
 Gene Host, P, 1956
 Chuck Hostetler, OF, 1944–1945
 Frank House, C, 1950–1957, 1961
 Fred House, P, 1913
 Art Houtteman, P, 1945–1953
 Frank Howard, OF, 1972–1973
Waite Hoyt, P, 1930–1931
 Clarence Huber, IF, 1920–1921
 Charles Hudson, P, 1989
 Frank Huelsman, OF, 1904
 Aubrey Huff, IF, 2009
 Tom Hughes, OF, 1930
 Mark Huismann, P, 1988
 Terry Humphrey, C, 1975
 Bob Humphreys, P, 1962
 Brian L. Hunter, OF, 1996–1999
 Torii Hunter, OF, 2013–2014
 Jimmy Hurst, OF, 1997
 Fred Hutchinson, P, 1939–1953
 Drew Hutchison, P, 2021–2022
 Tim Hyers, IF, 1996

I

 José Iglesias, IF, 2013, 2015–2018
 Gary Ignasiak, P, 1973
 Pete Incaviglia, OF, 1991, 1998
 Omar Infante, IF, 2002–2007, 2012–2013
 Brandon Inge, IF, 2001–2012
 Riccardo Ingram, OF, 1994
 Ed Irvin, IF, 1912
 Mike Ivie, IF, 1982–1983

J

 Austin Jackson, OF, 2010–2014
 Damian Jackson, IF, 2002
 Edwin Jackson, P, 2009
 Herb Jackson, P, 1905
 Ron Jackson, IF, 1981
 Ryan Jackson, IF, 2000–2002
 Baby Doll Jacobson, OF, 1915
 Charlie Jaeger, P, 1904
 Art James, OF, 1975
 Bill James, P, 1915–1919
 Bob James, P, 1982–1983
 Kevin Jarvis, P, 1997
 Paul Jata, IF, 1972
 Myles Jaye, P, 2017
 Gregg Jefferies, IF, 1999–2000
Hughie Jennings, IF, 1907–1918
 Marcus Jensen, C, 1997–1998
 Willie Jensen, P, 1912
 Eduardo Jiménez, P, 2019
 Jason Jiménez, P, 2002
 Joe Jiménez, P, 2017–2022
 Augie Johns, P, 1926–1927
 Alex Johnson, OF, 1976
 Brian Johnson, C, 1996–1997
 Dave Johnson, P, 1993
 Earl Johnson, P, 1951
 Howard Johnson, IF, 1982–1984
 Jason Johnson, P, 2004–2005
 Jim Johnson, P, 2014
 Ken Johnson, P, 1952
 Mark Johnson, P, 2000
 Roy Johnson, OF, 1929–1932
 Syl Johnson, P, 1922–1925
 Alex Jones, P, 1903
 Bob Jones, IF, 1917–1925
 Dalton Jones, IF, 1970–1972
 Davy Jones, OF, 1906–1912
 Deacon Jones, P, 1916–1918
 Elijah Jones, P, 1907–1909
 JaCoby Jones, IF, 2016–2021
 Jacque Jones, OF, 2008
 Ken Jones, P, 1924
 Lynn Jones, OF, 1979–1983
 Ruppert Jones, OF, 1984
 Sam Jones, P, 1962
 Todd Jones, P, 1997–2001, 2006–2008
 Tom Jones, IF, 1909–1910
 Tracy Jones, OF, 1989–1990
 Milt Jordan, P, 1953
 Matt Joyce, OF, 2008
 Jair Jurrjens, P, 2007
 Walt Justis, P, 1905

K

 Jeff Kaiser, P, 1991
 Al Kaline, OF, 1953–1974
 Rudy Kallio, P, 1918–1919
 Harry Kane, P, 1903
 Gabe Kapler, OF, 1998–1999
 Jason Karnuth, P, 2005
 Marty Kavanagh, IF, 1914–1916, 1918
 Greg Keagle, P, 1996–1998
George Kell, IF, 1946–1952
 Mick Kelleher, IF, 1981–1982
 Kris Keller, P, 2002
 Charlie Keller, OF, 1950–1951
 Bryan Kelly, P, 1986–1987
 Don Kelly, OF 2009–2014
 Steve Kemp, OF, 1977–1981
 Bob Kennedy, OF, 1956
 Vern Kennedy, P, 1938–1939
 Logan Kensing, P, 2016
 Russ Kerns, PH, 1945
 John Kerr, IF, 1923–1924
 Masao Kida, P, 1999–2000
 John Kiely, P, 1991–1993
 Mike Kilkenny, P, 1969–1972
 Red Killefer, OF, 1907–1909
 Ed Killian, P, 1904–1910
 Bruce Kimm, C, 1976–1977
 Chad Kimsey, P, 1936
 Chick King, OF, 1954–1956
 Eric King, P, 1986–1988, 1992
 Gene Kingsale, OF, 2003
 Dennis Kinney, P, 1981
 Ian Kinsler, IF, 2014–2017
 Matt Kinzer, P, 1990
 Jay Kirke, OF, 1910
 Rube Kisinger, P, 1902–1903
 Frank Kitson, P, 1903–1905
 Danny Klassen, IF, 2003
 Al Klawitter, P, 1913
 Ron Kline, P, 1961–1962
 Johnny Klippstein, P, 1967
 Corey Knebel, P, 2014
 Rudy Kneisch, P, 1926
 Ray Knight, IF, 1988
 Gary Knotts, P, 2003–2004
 John Knox, IF, 1972–1975
 Kurt Knudsen, P, 1992–1994
 Guido Knudson, P, 2015
 Alan Koch, P, 1963–1964
 Brad Kocher, C, 1912
 Mark Koenig, IF, 1930–1931
 Don Kolloway, IF, 1949–1952
 Howie Koplitz, P, 1961–1962
 George Korince, P, 1966–1967
 Frank Kostro, IF, 1962–1963
 Pete Kozma, IF, 2018
 Marc Krauss, IF, 2015
 Ryan Kreidler, IF,2022–present
 Wayne Krenchicki, IF, 1983
 Chuck Kress, IF, 1954
 Red Kress, IF, 1939–1940
 Lou Kretlow, P, 1946–1949
 Chad Kreuter, C, 1992–1994
 Ian Krol, P, 2014–2015, 2021
 Bill Krueger, P, 1993–1994
 Dick Kryhoski, IF, 1950–1951
 Harvey Kuenn, OF, 1952–1959
 Rusty Kuntz, OF, 1984–1985

L

 Chet Laabs, OF, 1937–1939
 Clem Labine, P, 1960
 Jairo Labourt, P, 2017
 Ed Lafitte, P, 1909–1912
 Mike Laga, IF, 1982–1986
 Lerrin LaGrow, P, 1970–1975
 Gerald Laird, C, 2009–2010, 2012
 Eddie Lake, IF, 1946–1950
 Joe Lake, P, 1912–1913
 Al Lakeman, C, 1954
 Chris Lambert, P, 2008–2009
 Gene Lamont, C, 1970–1975
 Les Lancaster, P, 1992
 Jim Landis, OF, 1967
 Marvin Lane, OF, 1971–1976
 Alex Lange, P, 2021–present
 Dave LaPoint, P, 1986
 Jeff Larish, IF, 2008–2010
 Steve Larkin, P, 1934
 Frank Lary, P, 1954–1964
 Fred Lasher, P, 1967–1970
 Chick Lathers, IF, 1910–1911
 Charley Lau, C, 1956–1959
 Derek Law, P, 2022
 Bill Lawrence, OF, 1932
 Roxie Lawson, P, 1933–1939
 Bill Laxton, P, 1976
 Jack Lazorko, P, 1986
 Rick Leach, OF, 1981–1983
 Razor Ledbetter, P, 1915
 Wilfredo Ledezma, P, 2003–2007
 Don Lee, P, 1957–1958
 Ron LeFlore, OF, 1974–1979
 Bill Leinhauser, OF, 1912
 Mark Leiter, P, 1991–1994
 Bill Lelivelt, P, 1909–1910
 Dave Lemanczyk, P, 1973–1976
 Chet Lemon, OF, 1982–1990
 Don Lenhardt, OF, 1952
 Jim Lentine, OF, 1980
 Arcenio León, P, 2017
 Dutch Leonard, P, 1919–1925
 Ted Lepcio, IF, 1959
 Pete LePine, OF, 1902
 George Lerchen, OF, 1952
 Don Leshnock, P, 1972
 Josh Lester, IF, 2022
 Al Levine, P, 2004
 Artie Lewicki, P, 2017–2018
 Colby Lewis, P, 2006
 Mark Lewis, IF, 1995–1996
 Richie Lewis, P, 1996
 José Lima, P, 1993–1996, 2001–2002
 Em Lindbeck, PH, 1960
 Jim Lindeman, OF, 1990
 Chris Lindsay, IF, 1905–1906
 Rod Lindsey, OF, 1998–2002
 Carl Linhart, PH, 1952
 Johnny Lipon, IF, 1942–1952
 Felipe Lira, P, 1995–1997, 1999
 Francisco Liriano, P, 2018
 Dick Littlefield, P, 1952
 Jack Lively, P, 1911
 Scott Livingstone, IF, 1991–1994
 Kyle Lobstein, P, 2014–2015
 Harry Lochhead, IF, 1901
 Bob Logan, P, 1937
 Nook Logan, OF, 2004–2006
 Mickey Lolich, P, 1963–1975
 George Lombard, OF, 2002
 Herman Long, IF, 1903
 Aurelio López, P, 1979–1985
 Aquilino López, P, 2007–2008
 Lefty Lorenzen, P, 1913
 Art Loudell, P, 1910
 Baldy Louden, IF, 1912–1913
 Shane Loux, P, 2002–2003
 Slim Love, P, 1919–1920
 Torey Lovullo, IF, 1988–1989
 Grover Lowdermilk, P, 1915–1916
 Bobby Lowe, IF, 1904–1907
 Mark Lowe, P, 2016
 Dwight Lowry, C, 1984–1987
 Willie Ludolph, P, 1924
 Dawel Lugo, IF, 2018–2020
 Urbano Lugo, P, 1990
 Jerry Lumpe, IF, 1964–1967
 Don Lund, OF, 1949–1954
 Scott Lusader, OF, 1987–1990
 Billy Lush, OF, 1903
 Fred Lynn, OF, 1988–1989
 Red Lynn, P, 1939
 Brandon Lyon, P, 2009

M

 Duke Maas, P, 1955–1957
 Frank MacCormack, P, 1976
 Rob MacDonald, P, 1993
 Dixon Machado, IF, 2015–2018
 Dave Machemer, IF, 1979
 José Macías, IF, 1999–2002
 Morris Madden, P, 1987
 Elliott Maddox, OF, 1970
 Dave Madison, P, 1952–1953
 Scotti Madison, IF, 1985–1986
 Bill Madlock, IF, 1987
 Wendell Magee, OF, 2000–2002
 Billy Maharg, IF, 1912
 Mickey Mahler, P, 1985
 Mikie Mahtook, OF, 2017–2019
 Bob Maier, IF, 1945
 Alex Main, P, 1914
 George Maisel, OF, 1916
 Tom Makowski, P, 1975
 Herm Malloy, P, 1907–1908
 Harry Malmberg, IF, 1955
 Hal Manders, P, 1941–1942, 1946
 Vincent Maney, IF, 1912
 Clyde Manion, C, 1920–1927
 Phil Mankowski, IF, 1976–1979
 Matt Manning, P, 2021–present
 Joe Mantiply, P, 2016
 Jeff Manto, IF, 1998
 Jerry Manuel, IF, 1975–1976
Heinie Manush, OF, 1923–1927
 Cliff Mapes, OF, 1952
 Firpo Marberry, P, 1933–1935
 Leo Marentette, P, 1965
 Dick Marlowe, P, 1951–1956
 Mike Maroth, P, 2002–2007
 Buck Marrow, P, 1932
 Mike Marshall, P, 1967
 Jefry Marté, IF, 2015
 Luis Marte, P, 2011–2012
 Billy Martin, IF, 1958
 John Martin, P, 1983
 Leonys Martín, OF, 2018
 J. D. Martinez, OF, 2014–2017
 Ramón Martínez, IF, 2005
 Víctor Martínez, DH, 2011–2018
 Roger Mason, P, 1984
 Walt Masterson, P, 1956
 Tom Matchick, IF, 1967–1969
Eddie Mathews, IF, 1967–1968
 Bob Mavis, -, 1949
 Brian Maxcy, P, 1995–1996
 Charlie Maxwell, OF, 1955–1962
 Milt May, C, 1976–1979
 Cameron Maybin, OF, 2007, 2016, 2020
 Eddie Mayo, IF, 1944–1948
 Nomar Mazara, OF, 2021
 Sport McAllister, OF, 1901–1903
 Zach McAllister, P, 2018
 Dick McAuliffe, IF, 1960–1973
 Macay McBride, P, 2007
 James McCann, C, 2014–2018
 Arch McCarthy, P, 1902
 Barney McCosky, OF, 1939–1946
 Benny McCoy, IF, 1938–1939
 Pat McCoy, P, 2014
 Ed McCreery, P, 1914
 Lance McCullers, P, 1990
 Jeff McCurry, P, 1996
 Mickey McDermott, P, 1958
 Red McDermott, OF, 1912
 Allen McDill, P, 2000
 John McDonald, IF, 2005
 Orlando McFarlane, C, 1966
 Jim McGarr, IF, 1912
 Dan McGarvey, OF, 1912
 Casey McGehee, IF, 2016
 Pat McGehee, P, 1912
 Deacon McGuire, C, 1902–1903, 1912
 John McHale, IF, 1943–1948
 Matty McIntyre, OF, 1904–1910
 Archie McKain, P, 1939–1941
 David McKay, P, 2019–2020
 Red McKee, C, 1913–1916
 Denny McLain, P, 1963–1970
 Pat McLaughlin, P, 1937, 1945
 Wayne McLeland, P, 1951–1952
 Sam McMackin, P, 1902
 Don McMahon, P, 1968–1969
 Frank McManus, C, 1904
 Marty McManus, IF, 1927–1931
 Billy McMillon, OF, 2000–2001
 Fred McMullin, IF, 1914
 Carl McNabb, PH, 1945
 Eric McNair, IF, 1941–1942
 Norm McRae, P, 1969–1970
 Bill McTigue, P, 1916
 Rusty Meacham, P, 1991
 Austin Meadows, OF, 2022–present
 Chris Mears, P, 2003
 Phil Meeler, P, 1972
 Mitch Meluskey, C, 2002
 Bob Melvin, C, 1985
 Orlando Mercado, C, 1987
 Melvin Mercedes, P, 2014
 Jordy Mercer, IF, 2019–2020
 Win Mercer, P, 1902
 Herm Merritt, IF, 1921
 José Mesa, P, 2007
 Scat Metha, IF, 1940
 Charlie Metro, OF, 1943–1944
 Dan Meyer, IF, 1974–1976
 Dutch Meyer, IF, 1940–1942
 Dan Miceli, P, 1997
 Gene Michael, IF, 1975
 Jim Middleton, P, 1921
 Ed Mierkowicz, OF, 1945–1948
 Andrew Miller, P, 2006–2007
 Bob Miller, P, 1953–1956
 Bob Miller, P, 1973
 Eddie Miller, OF, 1982
 Hack Miller, C, 1944–1945
 Justin Miller, P, 2014
 Matt Miller, P, 2001–2002
 Orlando Miller, IF, 1997
 Roscoe Miller, P, 1901–1902
 Trever Miller, P, 1996
 Zach Miner, P, 2006–2009
 Clarence Mitchell, P, 1911
 Willie Mitchell, P, 1916–1919
 Casey Mize, P, 2020–present
 Dave Mlicki, P, 1999–2001
 Brian Moehler, P, 1996–2002
 Herb Moford, P, 1958
 John Mohardt, OF, 1922
 Bob Molinaro, OF, 1975, 1977, 1983
 Dustin Molleken, P, 2016
 Bill Monbouquette, P, 1966–1967
 Sid Monge, P, 1984
 Craig Monroe, OF, 2002–2007
 Manny Montejo, P, 1961
 Anse Moore, OF, 1946
 Bill Moore, P, 1925
 Jackie Moore, C, 1965
 Matt Moore, P,  2019
 Mike Moore, P, 1993–1995
 Roy Moore, P, 1922–1923
 Jake Mooty, P, 1944
 Jerry Morales, OF, 1979
 Harry Moran, P, 1912
 Keith Moreland, OF, 1989
 Chet Morgan, OF, 1935–1938
 Tom Morgan, P, 1958–1960
 George Moriarty, IF, 1909–1915
 Hal Morris, IF, 2000
 Jack Morris, P, 1977–1990
 Warren Morris, IF, 2003
 Bill Morrisette, P, 1920
 Jim Morrison, IF, 1987–1988
 Bubba Morton, OF, 1961–1963
 Lloyd Moseby, OF, 1990–1991
 Jerry Moses, C, 1974
 John Moses, OF, 1991
 Don Mossi, P, 1959–1963
 Steven Moya, OF, 2014–2016
 Les Mueller, P, 1941–1945
 Edward Mujica, P, 2017
 Billy Mullen, IF, 1926
 George Mullin, P, 1902–1913
 Pat Mullin, OF, 1940–1953
 Mike Munoz, P, 1991–1993
 Eric Munson, IF, 2000–2004
 Dwayne Murphy, OF, 1988
 John Murphy, IF, 1903
 Heath Murray, P, 2001
 Glenn Myatt, C, 1936
 Mike Myers, P, 1995–1997

N

 Russ Nagelson, OF, 1970
 Bill Nahorodny, C, 1983
 Kid Nance, OF, 1901
 Ray Narleski, P, 1959
 Joe Nathan, P, 2014–2015
 Efren Navarro, IF, 2017
 Julio Navarro, P, 1964–1966
 Bots Nekola, P, 1933
 Lynn Nelson, P, 1940
 Ángel Nesbitt, P, 2015
 Jack Ness, IF, 1911
 Jim Nettles, OF, 1974
 Johnny Neun, IF, 1925–1928
 Phil Nevin, IF, 1995–1997
 Hal Newhouser, P, 1939–1953
 Bobo Newsom, P, 1939–1941
 Fu-Te Ni, P, 2009–2010
 Simon Nicholls, IF, 1903
 Fred Nicholson, OF, 1917
 Joe Niekro, P, 1970–1972
 Bob Nieman, OF, 1953–1954
 Melvin Nieves, OF, 1996–1997
 Ron Nischwitz, P, 1961–1962, 1965
 C. J. Nitkowski, P, 1995–1996, 1999–2001
 Matt Nokes, C, 1986–1990
 Dickie Noles, P, 1987
 Hideo Nomo, P, 2000
 Daniel Norris, P, 2015–2021, 2022
 Lou North, P, 1913
 Jim Northrup, OF, 1964–1974
 Greg Norton, IF, 2004
 Randy Nosek, P, 1989–1990
 Iván Nova, P, 2020
 Roberto Novoa, P, 2004
 Edwin Núñez, P, 1989–1990
 Renato Núñez, IF, 2021

O

 John O'Connell, IF, 1902
 Charley O'Leary, IF, 1904–1912
 Ollie O'Mara, IF, 1912
 Randy O'Neal, P, 1984–1986
 Frank O'Rourke, IF, 1924–1926
 Prince Oana, P, 1943–1945
 Ben Oglivie, OF, 1974–1977
 Frank Okrie, P, 1920
 Red Oldham, P, 1914–1922
 Omar Olivares, P, 1996–1997
 Andy Oliver, P, 2010–2011
 Joe Oliver, C, 1997–1998
 Lester Oliveros, P, 2011
 Ole Olsen, P, 1922–1923
 Gregg Olson, P, 1996
 Karl Olson, OF, 1957
 Eddie Onslow, IF, 1912–1913
 Jack Onslow, C, 1912
 Magglio Ordóñez, OF, 2005–2011
 Joe Orengo, IF, 1944
 Joe Orrell, P, 1943–1945
 José Ortega, P, 2012–2014
 Bobo Osborne, IF, 1957–1962
 Jimmy Outlaw, OF, 1943–1949
 Stubby Overmire, P, 1943–1949
 Frank Owen, P, 1901
 Marv Owen, IF, 1931–1937
 Ray Oyler, IF, 1965–1968

P

 John Pacella, P, 1986
 Phil Page, P, 1928–1930
 David Palmer, P, 1989
 Dean Palmer, IF, 1999–2003
 José Paniagua, P, 2002
 Stan Papi, IF, 1980–1981
 Craig Paquette, IF, 2002–2003
 Isaac Paredes, IF, 2020–2021
 Johnny Paredes, IF, 1990–1991
 Mark Parent, C, 1996
 Clay Parker, P, 1990
 Salty Parker, IF, 1936
 Slicker Parks, P, 1921
 Bobby Parnell, P, 2016
 Lance Parrish, C, 1977–1986
 Dixie Parsons, C, 1939–1943
 Steve Partenheimer, IF, 1913
 Johnny Pasek, C, 1933
 Larry Pashnick, P, 1982–1983
 Bob Patrick, OF, 1941–1942
 Danny Patterson, P, 2000–2004
 Daryl Patterson, P, 1968–1971
 Jarrod Patterson, IF, 2001
 David Pauley, P, 2011
 Fred Payne, C, 1906–1908
 Terry Pearson, P, 2002
 Marv Peasley, P, 1910
 Al Pedrique, IF, 1989
 Mike Pelfrey, P, 2016
 Rudy Pemberton, OF, 1995
 Brayan Peña, C, 2013
 Carlos Peña, IF, 2002–2006
 Orlando Peña, P, 1965–1967
 Ramón Peña, P, 1989
 Shannon Penn, DH, 1995–1996
 Brad Penny, P, 2011
 Gene Pentz, P, 1975
 Pepper Peploski, IF, 1913
 Don Pepper, IF, 1966
 Jhonny Peralta, IF, 2010–2013
 Wily Peralta, P, 2021–2022
 Troy Percival, P, 2005
 Hernán Pérez, IF, 2012–2015
 Neifi Pérez, IF, 2006–2007
 Timo Pérez, OF, 2007
 Matt Perisho, P, 2001–2002
 Cy Perkins, C, 1934
 Hub Pernoll, P, 1910–1912
 Ron Perranoski, P, 1971–1972
 Pol Perritt, P, 1921
 Boyd Perry, IF, 1941
 Clay Perry, IF, 1908
 Hank Perry, OF, 1912
 Jim Perry, P, 1973
 Ryan Perry, P, 2009–2011
 Johnny Pesky, IF, 1952–1954
 John Peters, C, 1915
 Rick Peters, OF, 1979–1981
 Dustin Peterson, OF, 2019
 Ben Petrick, C, 2003
 Dan Petry, P, 1979–1987, 1990–1991
 Gary Pettis, OF, 1988–1989, 1992
 Adam Pettyjohn, P, 2001
 Dave Philley, OF, 1957
 Bubba Phillips, IF, 1955, 1963–1964
 Eddie Phillips, C, 1929
 Jack Phillips, IF, 1955–1957
 Red Phillips, P, 1934–1936
 Tony Phillips, OF, 1990–1994
 Billy Pierce, P, 1945–1948
 Jack Pierce, IF, 1975
 Tony Piet, IF, 1938
 Herman Pillette, P, 1922–1924
 Luis Pineda, P, 2001
 Michael Pineda, P, 2022
 Babe Pinelli, IF, 1920
 Wally Pipp, IF, 1913
 Cotton Pippen, P, 1939–1940
 Chris Pittaro, IF, 1985
 Al Platte, OF, 1913
 Johnny Podres, P, 1966–1967
 Boots Poffenberger, P, 1937–1938
 Plácido Polanco, IF, 2005–2009
 Luis Polonia, OF, 1998–2000
 Jim Poole, P, 1999–2000
 Rick Porcello, P, 2009–2014
 Jay Porter, C, 1955–1957
 Lew Post, OF, 1902
 Brian Powell, P, 1998–1999, 2002
 Ray Powell, OF, 1913
 Ted Power, P, 1988
 Del Pratt, IF, 1923–1924
 Joe Presko, P, 1957–1958
 Alex Presley, OF, 2016–2017
 David Price, P, 2014–2015
 Jim Price, C, 1967–1971
 Jerry Priddy, IF, 1950–1953
 Curtis Pride, OF, 1996–1997
 Jim Proctor, P, 1959
 Augie Prudhomme, P, 1929
 Tim Pugh, P, 1997
 David Purcey, P, 2011
 Billy Purtell, IF, 1914
 Luke Putkonen, P, 2012–2014
 Ed Putman, C, 1979

Q

 George Quellich, OF, 1931

R

 Mike Rabelo, C, 2006–2007
 Ryan Raburn, OF, 2004, 2007–2012
 Dick Radatz, P, 1969
 Rip Radcliff, OF, 1941–1943
 Ed Rakow, P, 1964–1965
 Erasmo Ramírez, P, 2021
 Nick Ramirez, P, 2019–2020
 Wilkin Ramírez, OF, 2009
 Wilson Ramos, C, 2021
 Joe Randa, IF, 1998
 Clay Rapada, P, 2007–2009
 Earl Rapp, OF, 1949
 Jim Ray, P, 1974
 Robbie Ray, P, 2014
 Bugs Raymond, P, 1904
 Mark Redman, P, 2001–2002
 Wayne Redmond, OF, 1965–1969
 Bob Reed, P, 1969–1970
 Evan Reed, P, 2013–2014
 Jody Reed, IF, 1997
 Rich Reese, IF, 1973
 Phil Regan, P, 1960–1965
 Frank Reiber, C, 1933–1936
 Zac Reininger, P, 2017–2019
 Alex Remneas, P, 1912
 Erwin Renfer, P, 1913
 Tony Rensa, C, 1930
 Édgar Rentería, IF, 2008
 Víctor Reyes, OF, 2018–2022
 Bob Reynolds, P, 1975
 Ross Reynolds, P, 1914–1915
 Billy Rhiel, IF, 1932–1933
 Will Rhymes, IF, 2010–2011
 Dennis Ribant, P, 1968
 Harry Rice, OF, 1928–1930
 Paul Richards, C, 1943–1946
 Nolen Richardson, IF, 1929–1932
 Rob Richie, OF, 1989
 Hank Riebe, C, 1942–1949
 Topper Rigney, IF, 1922–1925
 Juan Rincón, P, 2009
 Danny Rios, P, 2000
 Billy Ripken, IF, 1998
 Kevin Ritz, P, 1989–1992
 Mike Rivera, C, 2001–2002
 Mike Roarke, C, 1961–1964
 Bruce Robbins, P, 1979–1980
 Bip Roberts, IF, 1998
 Dave Roberts, P, 1976–1977
 Leon Roberts, OF, 1974–1975
 Willis Roberts, P, 1999–2000
 Jerry Robertson, P, 1970
 Nate Robertson, P, 2003–2009
 Aaron Robinson, C, 1949–1951
 Eddie Robinson, IF, 1957
 Jeff Robinson, P, 1987–1990
 Rabbit Robinson, IF, 1904
 Jacob Robson, OF, 2021
 Fernando Rodney, P, 2002–2003, 2005–2009
 Aurelio Rodríguez, IF, 1971–1979
 Eduardo Rodríguez, P, 2022–present
 Elvin Rodríguez, P, 2022
 Francisco Rodríguez, P, 2016–2017
Iván Rodríguez, C, 2004–2008
 Ronny Rodríguez, IF, 2018–2019
 Steve Rodriguez, IF, 1995
 Joe Rogalski, P, 1938
 Billy Rogell, IF, 1930–1939
 Jake Rogers, C, 2019, 2021
 Kenny Rogers, P, 2006–2008
 Saul Rogovin, P, 1949–1951
 Mel Rojas, P, 1999
 Bill Roman, IF, 1964–1965
 Ed Romero, IF, 1990
 Andrew Romine, IF, 2014–2017
 Austin Romine, C, 2020
 Henri Rondeau, OF, 1913
 Bruce Rondón, P, 2013, 2015–2017
 Matt Roney, P, 2003
 Jim Rooker, P, 1968
 Trevor Rosenthal, P, 2019
 Cody Ross, OF, 2003
 Don Ross, IF, 1938, 1942–1945
 Tyson Ross, P, 2019
 Claude Rossman, IF, 1907–1909
 Larry Rothschild, P, 1981–1982
 Jack Rowan, P, 1906
 Schoolboy Rowe, P, 1933–1942
 Rich Rowland, C, 1990–1993
 Dave Rozema, P, 1977–1984
 Art Ruble, OF, 1927
 Dave Rucker, P, 1981–1983
 Muddy Ruel, C, 1931–1932
 Chance Ruffin, P, 2011
 Vern Ruhle, P, 1974–1977
 Sean Runyan, P, 1998–2000
 Jack Russell, P, 1937
 Dusty Ryan, C, 2008–2009
 Kyle Ryan, P, 2014–2017

S

 Erik Sabel, P, 2002
 A. J. Sager, P, 1996–1998
 Mark Salas, C, 1990–1991
 Luis Salazar, IF, 1988
 Oscar Salazar, IF, 2002
 Jarrod Saltalamacchia, C, 2016, 2018
 Ron Samford, IF, 1955–1957
 Juan Samuel, IF, 1994–1995
 Joe Samuels, P, 1930
 Alejandro Sánchez, OF, 1985
 Alex Sánchez, OF, 2003–2004
 Aníbal Sánchez, P, 2012–2017
 Reggie Sanders, IF, 1974
 Scott Sanders, P, 1997–1998
 Julio Santana, P, 2002
 Marino Santana, P, 1998
 Pedro Santana, IF, 2001
 Ramón Santiago, IF, 2002–2003, 2006–2013
 Omir Santos, C, 2011–2012
 Víctor Santos, P, 2001
 Dane Sardinha, C, 2008–2009
 Joe Sargent, IF, 1921
 Kevin Saucier, P, 1981–1982
 Dennis Saunders, P, 1970
 Warwick Saupold, P, 2016–2018
 Jay Sborz, P, 2010
 Bob Scanlan, P, 1996
 Ray Scarborough, P, 1953
 Germany Schaefer, IF, 1905–1909
 Biff Schaller, OF, 1911
 Wally Schang, C, 1931
 Dan Schatzeder, P, 1980–1981
 Frank Scheibeck, IF, 1906
 Fred Scherman, P, 1969–1973
 Bill Scherrer, P, 1984–1986
 Max Scherzer, P, 2010–2014
 Lou Schiappacasse, OF, 1902
 Daniel Schlereth, P, 2010–2012
 Brian Schmack, P, 2003–2004
 Boss Schmidt, C, 1906–1911
 Jonathan Schoop, IF, 2020–present
 John Schreiber, P, 2019–2020
 Rick Schu, IF, 1989
 Heinie Schuble, IF, 1929–1935
 Barney Schultz, P, 1959
 Bob Schultz, P, 1955
 Mike Schwabe, P, 1989–1990
 Chuck Scrivener, IF, 1975–1977
 Johnnie Seale, P, 1964–1965
 Steve Searcy, P, 1988–1991
 Tom Seats, P, 1940
 Bobby Seay, P, 2006–2009
 Frank Secory, OF, 1940
 Chuck Seelbach, P, 1971–1974
 Ray Semproch, P, 1960
 Rip Sewell, P, 1932
 Dick Sharon, OF, 1973–1974
 Al Shaw, C, 1901
 Bob Shaw, P, 1957–1958
 Merv Shea, C, 1927–1929, 1939
 Larry Sheets, DH, 1990
 Gary Sheffield, OF, 2007–2008
 John Shelby, OF, 1990–1991
 Hugh Shelley, OF, 1935
 Chris Shelton, IF, 2004–2006
 Pat Sheridan, OF, 1986–1989
 Larry Sherry, P, 1964–1967
 Jimmy Shevlin, IF, 1930
 Ivey Shiver, OF, 1931
 Ron Shoop, C, 1959
 Zack Short, IF, 2021–present
 Chick Shorten, OF, 1919–1921
 Joe Siddall, C, 1998–1999
 Rubén Sierra, OF, 1996
 Ed Siever, P, 1901–1902, 1906–1908
 Frank Sigafoos, IF, 1929
Al Simmons, OF, 1936
 Hack Simmons, IF, 1910
 Nelson Simmons, OF, 1984–1985
 Alfredo Simón, P, 2015
 Randall Simon, IF, 2001–2002
 Duke Sims, C, 1972–1973
 Matt Sinatro, C, 1989
 Duane Singleton, OF, 1996
 Dave Sisler, P, 1959–1960
 Scott Sizemore, IF, 2010–2011
 Dave Skeels, P, 1910
 Lou Skizas, OF, 1958
 John Skopec, P, 1903
 Tarik Skubal, P, 2020–present
 Jim Slaton, P, 1978, 1986
 Bill Slayback, P, 1972–1974
 Lou Sleater, P, 1957–1958
 Jim Small, OF, 1955–1957
 Bob Smith, P, 1959
 Chad Smith, P,  2014
 Clay Smith, P, 1940
 George Smith, P, 1926–1929
 George Smith, IF, 1963–1965
 Heinie Smith, IF, 1903
 Jack Smith, IF, 1912
 Jason Smith, IF, 2004–2005
 Rufus Smith, P, 1927
 Willie Smith, OF, 1963
 Josh Smoker, P, 2018
 Drew Smyly, P, 2012–2014
 Nate Snell, P, 1987
 Clint Sodowsky, P, 1995–1996
 Joakim Soria, P, 2014–2015
 Vic Sorrell, P, 1928–1937
 Elías Sosa, P, 1982
 Gregory Soto, P, 2019–2022
 Steve Souchock, OF, 1951–1955
 Steve Sparks, P, 2000–2003
 Joe Sparma, P, 1964–1969
 Kid Speer, P, 1909
 George Spencer, P, 1958–1960
 Tubby Spencer, C, 1916–1918
 Charlie Spikes, OF, 1978
 Harry Spilman, IF, 1986
 Chris Spurling, P, 2003, 2005–206
 Max St. Pierre, C, 2010
 Tuck Stainback, OF, 1940–1941
 Matt Stairs, OF, 2006
 Gerry Staley, P, 1961
 Oscar Stanage, C, 1909–1925
 Mickey Stanley, OF, 1964–1978
 Joe Staton, IF, 1972–1973
 Rusty Staub, OF, 1976–1979
 Bill Steen, P, 1915
 Dave Stegman, OF, 1978–1980
 Ben Steiner, IF, 1947
 Todd Steverson, OF, 1995
 Christin Stewart, OF, 2018–2020
 Lefty Stewart, P, 1921
 Phil Stidham, P, 1994
 Bob Stoddard, P, 1985
 John Stone, OF, 1928–1933
 Lil Stoner, P, 1922–1929
 Jesse Stovall, P, 1904
 Mike Strahler, P, 1973
 Bob Strampe, P, 1972
 Doug Strange, IF, 1989
 Walt Streuli, C, 1954–1956
 Sailor Stroud, P, 1910
 Marlin Stuart, P, 1949–1952
 Franklin Stubbs, IF, 1995
 Jim Stump, P, 1957–1959
 Daniel Stumpf, P, 2017–2019
 Tom Sturdivant, P, 1963
 Eugenio Suárez, IF, 2014
 Joe Sugden, C, 1912
 George Suggs, P, 1908–1909
 Billy Sullivan, C, 1916
 Billy Sullivan, Jr., C, 1940–1941
 Charlie Sullivan, P, 1928–1931
 Jackie Sullivan, IF, 1944
 Joe Sullivan, P, 1935–1936
 John Sullivan, C, 1905
 John Sullivan, C, 1963–1965
 Russ Sullivan, OF, 1951–1953
 Champ Summers, OF, 1979–1981
 Ed Summers, P, 1908–1912
 George Susce, P, 1958–1959
 George Susce, C, 1932
 Gary Sutherland, IF, 1974–1976
 Suds Sutherland, P, 1921
 Bill Sweeney, IF, 1928
 Bob Swift, C, 1944–1953
 Bob Sykes, P, 1977–1978
 Ken Szotkiewicz, IF, 1970

T

 Frank Tanana, P, 1985–1992
 Jordan Tata, P, 2006–2008
 Jackie Tavener, IF, 1921–1928
 Ben Taylor, IF, 1952
 Bill Taylor, OF, 1957–1958
 Bruce Taylor, P, 1977–1979
 Gary Taylor, P, 1969
 Tony Taylor, IF, 1971–1973
 Wiley Taylor, P, 1911
 Birdie Tebbetts, C, 1936–1947
 Julio Teherán, P, 2021
 Walt Terrell, P, 1985–1988, 1990–1992
 John Terry, P, 1902
 Mickey Tettleton, C, 1991–1994
 Marcus Thames, OF, 2004–2009
 Brad Thomas, P, 2010–2011
 Clete Thomas, OF, 2008–2012
 Frosty Thomas, P, 1905
 Bud Thomas, P, 1939–1941
 George Thomas, OF, 1957–1961, 1963–1965
 Ira Thomas, C, 1908
 Jason Thompson, IF, 1976–1980
 Justin Thompson, P, 1996–1999
Sam Thompson, OF, 1906
 Tim Thompson, C, 1958
 Gary Thurman, OF, 1993
 Mark Thurmond, P, 1986–1987
 Tom Timmermann, P, 1969–1973
 Ron Tingley, C, 1995
 Dave Tobik, P, 1978–1982
 Jim Tobin, P, 1945
 Kevin Tolar, P, 2000–2001
 Tim Tolman, OF, 1986–1987
 Andy Tomberlin, OF, 1998
 Earl Torgeson, IF, 1955–1957
 Spencer Torkelson, IF, 2022–present
 Andrés Torres, OF, 2002–2004
 Carlos Torres, P, 2019
 Dick Tracewski, IF, 1966–1969
 Alan Trammell, IF, 1977–1996
 Bubba Trammell, OF, 1997
 Allan Travers, P, 1912
 Tom Tresh, OF, 1969
 Matt Treanor, C, 2009
 Gus Triandos, C, 1963
 Dizzy Trout, P, 1939–1952
 Bun Troy, P, 1912
 Chris Truby, IF, 2002
 Virgil Trucks, P, 1941–1952, 1956
 Mike Trujillo, P, 1988–1989
 John Tsitouris, P, 1957
 Matt Tuiasosopo, OF, 2013
 Spencer Turnbull, P, 2018–2021
 Jacob Turner, P, 2011–2012, 2018
 Jerry Turner, OF, 1982
 Bill Tuttle, OF, 1952–1957
 Guy Tutwiler, aka "King Tut", IF, 1911–1913

U

 Bob Uhl, P, 1940
 George Uhle, P, 1929–1933
 Jerry Ujdur, P, 1980–1983
 Pat Underwood, P, 1979–1983
 Al Unser, C, 1942–1944
 Justin Upton, OF, 2016–2017
 Tom Urbani, P, 1996
 Ugueth Urbina, P, 2004–2005
 Lino Urdaneta, P, 2004
 José Ureña, P, 2021

V

 José Valdez, P, 2015–2016
 Vito Valentinetti, P, 1958
 José Valverde, P, 2010–2013
 Andy Van Hekken, P, 2002–2004
 Todd Van Poppel, P, 1996
 Elam Vangilder, P, 1928–1929
 Virgil Vasquez, P, 2006–2007
 Bobby Veach, OF, 1912–1923
 Coot Veal, IF, 1958–1960, 1963
 Lou Vedder, P, 1920
 José Veras, P, 2013
 Randy Veres, P, 1996
 Drew VerHagen, P, 2014–2019
 Justin Verlander, P, 2005–2017
 Tom Veryzer, IF, 1973–1977
 Will Vest, P, 2022–present
 George Vico, IF, 1948–1949
 Brandon Villafuerte, P, 2000
 Brayan Villarreal, P, 2011–2013
 Fernando Viña, IF, 2004
 Ozzie Virgil, IF, 1958–1961
 Joe Vitiello, DH, 2004
 Ossie Vitt, IF, 1912–1918

W

 Jake Wade, P, 1936–1938
 Hal Wagner, C, 1947–1948
 Mark Wagner, IF, 1976–1980
 Dick Wakefield, OF, 1941–1949
 Chris Wakeland, OF, 2001
 Matt Walbeck, C, 1996–1997, 2002–2003
 Jim Walewander, IF, 1987–1988
 Dixie Walker, OF, 1938–1939
 Frank Walker, OF, 1917–1918
 Gee Walker, OF, 1931–1937
 Hub Walker, OF, 1931, 1935, 1945
 Jamie Walker, P, 2002–2006
 Luke Walker, P, 1974
 Mike Walker, P, 1996
 Tom Walker, P, 1975
 Jim Walkup, P, 1927
 Jim Walkup, P, 1939
 Jim Walsh, P, 1921
 Steve Wapnick, P, 1990
 Gary Ward, OF, 1989–1990
 Hap Ward, OF, 1912
 Jon Warden, P, 1968
 Jack Warner, IF, 1925–1928
 John Warner, C, 1905–1906
 Jarrod Washburn, P, 2009
 Johnny Watson, IF, 1930
 Jeff Weaver, P, 1999–2002
 Jim Weaver, OF, 1985
 Roger Weaver, P, 1980
 Earl Webb, OF, 1932–1933
 Skeeter Webb, IF, 1945–1947
 Thad Weber, P, 2012
 Herm Wehmeier, P, 1958
 Dick Weik, P, 1953–1954
 Robbie Weinhardt, P, 2010–2011
 Milt Welch, C, 1945
 Joey Wentz, P, 2022–present
 Casper Wells, OF, 2010–2011
 David Wells, P, 1993–1995
 Ed Wells, P, 1923–1927
 Don Wert, IF, 1963–1970
 Vic Wertz, OF, 1947–1952, 1961–1963
 Charlie Wheatley, P, 1912
 Kevin Whelan, P, 2014
 Jack Whillock, P, 1971
 Lou Whitaker, IF, 1977–1995
 Derrick White, IF, 1995
 Hal White, P, 1941–1952
 Jo-Jo White, OF, 1932–1938
 Rondell White, OF, 2004–2005
 Earl Whitehill, P, 1923–1932
 Sean Whiteside, P, 1995
 Kevin Wickander, P, 1995
 Dave Wickersham, P, 1964–1967
 Jimmy Wiggs, P, 1905–1906
 Bill Wight, P, 1952–1953
 Milt Wilcox, P, 1977–1985
 Adam Wilk, P, 2011–2012
 Ed Willett, P, 1906–1913
 Brian Williams, P, 1996
 Eddie Williams, IF, 1996
 Frank Williams, P, 1989
 Johnnie Williams, P, 1914
 Kenny Williams, OF, 1989–1990
 Lefty Williams, P, 1913–1914
 Carl Willis, P, 1984
 Dontrelle Willis, P, 2008–2010
 Alex Wilson, P, 2015–2018
 Bobby Wilson, C, 2016, 2019
 Earl Wilson, P, 1966–1970
 George F. Wilson, C, 1911
 Glenn Wilson, OF, 1982–1983
 Josh Wilson, IF, 2015
 Icehouse Wilson, PH, 1934
 Jack Wilson, P, 1942
 Justin Wilson, P, 2016–2017
 Mutt Wilson, P, 1920
 Red Wilson, C, 1954–1960
 Vance Wilson, C, 2005–2006
 Walter Wilson, P, 1945
 Al Wingo, OF, 1924–1928
 George Winter, P, 1908
 Casey Wise, IF, 1960
 Hughie Wise, C, 1930
 Kevin Witt, DH, 2003
 John Wockenfuss, C, 1974–1983
 Pete Wojey, P, 1956–1957
 Randy Wolf, P, 2015
 Bob Wood, C, 1904–1905
 Jake Wood, IF, 1961–1967
 Jason Wood, IF, 1998–1999
 Joe Wood, IF, 1943
 Larry Woodall, C, 1920–1929
 Hal Woodeshick, P, 1956, 1961
 Ron Woods, OF, 1969
 Mark Woodyard, P, 2005–2006
 Danny Worth, OF, 2010–2014
 Ralph Works, P, 1909–1912
 Tim Worrell, P, 1998
 Yats Wuestling, IF, 1929–1930
 John Wyatt, P, 1968
 Whit Wyatt, P, 1929–1933

X

Y

 Esteban Yan, P, 2004
 Emil Yde, P, 1929
 Joe Yeager, IF, 1901–1903
 Archie Yelle, C, 1917–1919
 Tom Yewcic, C, 1957
 Rudy York, IF, 1934–1945
 Eddie Yost, IF, 1959–1960
 Delmon Young, OF, 2011–2012
 Dmitri Young, OF, 2002–2006
 Ernie Young, OF, 2003
 John Young, IF, 1971
 Matt Young, OF, 2012
 Kip Young, P, 1978–1979
 Ralph Young, IF, 1915–1921

Z

 Chris Zachary, P, 1972
 Carl Zamloch, P, 1913
 Bill Zepp, P, 1971
 Gus Zernial, OF, 1958–1959
 Jordan Zimmermann, P, 2016–2020
 Joel Zumaya, P, 2006–2011
 George Zuverink, P, 1954–1955

See also
 Detroit Tigers Nicknames: colorful nicknames from the Tigers past and present
 List of Detroit Tigers broadcasters
 Managers and ownership of the Detroit Tigers

External links
 All-time list of batters
 All-time list of pitchers

Roster
Major League Baseball all-time rosters